Nick Karner (born July 7, 1982), is an American actor and director.

Karner was born in Hartford, Connecticut.  He is best known as the director of the documentary Babs Johnson, for which he received several awards including Best Director at the Honolulu Film Festival.  He has also written and directed over 20 short films as well as acted in several of them.

References

External links

 http://www.prankfilms.com
 http://www.mamut.net/4festival/newsdet6.htm

American male film actors
American documentary filmmakers
Living people
1982 births
Male actors from Hartford, Connecticut
Needham B. Broughton High School alumni